The Alinda asteroids are a dynamical group of asteroids with a semi-major axis of about 2.5 AU and an orbital eccentricity approximately between 0.4 and 0.65. The namesake is 887 Alinda, discovered by Max Wolf in 1918.

These objects are held in this region by the 3:1 orbital resonance with Jupiter (2.502 AU), which results in their being close to a 1:4 resonance with Earth (2.520 AU). An object in this resonance has its orbital eccentricity steadily increased by gravitational interactions with Jupiter until it eventually has a close encounter with an inner planet that breaks the resonance.

Some Alindas have perihelia very close to Earth's orbit, resulting in a series of close encounters at almost exactly four-year intervals, due to the 1:4 near resonance.

One consequence of this is that if an Alinda asteroid happens to be in an unfavorable position for viewing at the time of its close approach to Earth (for instance, at a small elongation from the Sun), then this situation can persist for decades.  Indeed, as of 2010, the Alinda asteroid 1915 Quetzálcoatl had been observed only once since 1985.

Another consequence is that some of these asteroids make repeated relatively close approaches to Earth, making them good subjects for study by Earth-based radar. Examples are 4179 Toutatis and 6489 Golevka, as well as 2019 MO, which impacted Earth in June 2019.

Dynamic age 
The 3:1 resonance with Jupiter causes a repeating growth in the eccentricity of the asteroid's orbit. Dynamically young members have an eccentricity ranging from about 0.30 to 0.34 staying mostly in the asteroid belt ranging 1.7–3.4 AU from the Sun. Older members such as 8709 Kadlu have an eccentricities between 0.465 and 0.475 and cross the orbit of Mars. (8709 Kadlu makes approaches close enough to Jupiter, Mars, and Earth to be gravitationally nudged.) The oldest members with eccentricities between 0.57 and 0.75 cross the orbit of Earth. 3360 Syrinx is the most eccentric of the Alinda group with an eccentricity of 0.7 and the orbit has a dynamically short life expectancy.

List of members

See also 

 Amor asteroid
 Apollo asteroid
 Aten asteroid

References 
 

Asteroid groups and families